A list of films produced in Pakistan in 1966 (see 1966 in film) and in the Urdu language:

1966

See also
 1966 in Pakistan

References

External links
 Search Pakistani film - IMDB.com

1966
Pakistani
Films